This is a partial list of alumni of the Clarion Workshop, an annual writers' workshop for science fiction, fantasy, and speculative literature writers.

See also
 List of Clarion Writers Workshop Instructors
 Clarion Workshop
 Clarion West Writers Workshop
 List of Clarion West Writers Workshop alumni

Clarion West Writers Workshop instructors
Creative writing programs
Science fiction organizations
Clarion West Writers Workshop instructors
Clarion West Writers Workshop instructors